Abathymermis is a genus of nematodes belonging to the family Mermithidae.

The genus was described in 1871 by Ivan Rubtsov.

Species:
 Abathymermis bissacea Rubtsov, 1973
 Abathymermis fiseri Johnson & Kleve, 1995
 Abathymermis ivaschkini Gafurov, 1980
 Abathymermis oesophaga Gafurov & An, 1989
 Abathymermis parva Rubtsov, 1973
 Abathymermis shocki Johnson & Kleve, 1995

References

Mermithidae
Enoplea genera